Mooar is an unincorporated community and census-designated place (CDP) in Lee County, Iowa, United States. U.S. Route 61 forms the northeast edge of the CDP, leading southeast into Keokuk and north  to Fort Madison. U.S. Route 218 runs concurrently with US-61 southeast to Keokuk, but leads northwest  to Donnellson.

Mooar was first listed as a CDP prior to the 2020 census.  As of the 2020 census, its population was 321.

Demographics

References 

Census-designated places in Lee County, Iowa
Census-designated places in Iowa